Yongjing is a railway station on the Taiwan Railways Administration West Coast line located in Yongjing Township, Changhua County, Taiwan. Despite the name of the station, Yongjing railway station is not close to Central Yongjing.

Structure 
Yongjing Station has two side platforms.

Around the station
 Yusan Hall

See also
 List of railway stations in Taiwan

References

External links 

1958 establishments in Taiwan
Railway stations in Changhua County
Railway stations opened in 1958
Railway stations served by Taiwan Railways Administration